The Prestwich by-election, 1918 was a parliamentary by-election held for the British House of Commons constituency of Prestwich on 28 October 1918. The seat had become vacant upon the death in action near Merville of the sitting Liberal MP, the Hon. Captain Oswald Cawley. Cawley had only held the seat since being election in a by-election in January of that year.

The Liberal candidate, Austin Hopkinson, was returned unopposed in support of the Coalition government of prime minister David Lloyd George.

References

See also

 January 1918 Prestwich by-election
 List of United Kingdom by-elections (1900–1918)

Prestwich
Prestwich
1910s in Lancashire
Prestwich 1918-10
Prestwich 1918-10
Prestwich 1918-10
Unopposed by-elections to the Parliament of the United Kingdom (need citation)
Prestwich